The 1950–51 season was the 49th in the history of the Western Football League.

Division Three was scrapped after only one season, and the league reverted to the previous two-division format. The champions for the second time in their history were Glastonbury, and the winners of Division Two were Stonehouse.

Division One
Division One remained at eighteen members with two clubs promoted to replace Soundwell and Bath City Reserves, who were relegated to Division Two.

Barnstaple Town, champions of Division Two
Dorchester Town, runners-up in Division Two

Division Two
Division Two was increased from eighteen clubs to twenty, after Barnstaple Town and Dorchester Town were promoted to Division One, and Bristol Aeroplane Company and Douglas left the league. Six new clubs joined:

Bath City Reserves, relegated from Division One.
Bideford Town, promoted as champions of Division Three.
Chipping Sodbury
Ilfracombe Town, promoted as runners-up of Division Three.
Minehead, promoted as third-placed club in Division Three.
Soundwell, relegated from Division One.

References

1950-51
4